Trippville is an unincorporated community in the town of Hillsboro, Vernon County, Wisconsin, United States. The community was named for Dier Tripp, who became the first postmaster in 1867.

Notes

Unincorporated communities in Vernon County, Wisconsin
Unincorporated communities in Wisconsin